Priestman v. United States, 4 U.S. (4 Dall.) 28 (1800), was an 1800 decision of the United States Supreme Court asserting that "Under the 19th section of the act of February 18th, 1793, (1 Stats, at Large, 313,) goods are liable to forfeiture though they did not belong to the master, owner, or any mariner of the vessel in which they were imported, and though the duties were paid on them at the port of entry."

See also
 List of United States Supreme Court cases, volume 4

References

External links
 

United States Supreme Court cases
United States Supreme Court cases of the Ellsworth Court
1800 in United States case law